John Bull was a French prize captured in 1798 that was lost on a slave trading voyage in 1802.

Career
She may have been the John Bull of 203 tons (bm), that received a letter of marque on 19 May 1798. Her master was Thomas Goodall. He had changed vessels by 1800.

John Bull first appeared in Lloyd's Register (LR) in 1801.

M'Dowell and Twemlow outfitted John Bull c.1801 as a slaver. Captain Thomas Wright sailed her from England on 24 August 1801 to the Bight of Biafra and Gulf of Guinea islands.

She was wrecked at the Portuguese island of Saint Thomas's (probably São Tomé and Príncipe) around June 1802. The Register of Shipping for 1802 carried the annotation that she was "lost".

Captain Hugh Crow sailed  in November 1801 for Africa from Liverpool. She was delayed for some time at Cape Palmas due to an absence of wind. After collecting a cargo of slaves at Bonny, Crow sailed for Saint Thomas to resupply. There Crow found Wright, his crew, and slaves from John Bull. Crow took them aboard, including some 60 slaves. Disease broke out among the rescued men and after Crow landed them some time later at Barbados, most died.

Notes

Citations

References
 
 

1790s ships
Captured ships
Age of Sail merchant ships
Merchant ships of the United Kingdom
Liverpool slave ships
Maritime incidents in 1802
Maritime incidents involving slave ships
Shipwrecks of Africa
Shipwrecks in the Atlantic Ocean